Frank Rossavik (born 21 December 1965) is a Norwegian journalist and writer.

Rossavik graduated from the University of Bergen in 1986 with a bachelor's degree in comparative politics. In 2004 he took the master's degree in international politics from the Centre Européen de Recherches Internationales et Stratégiques. He worked as a journalist in Rogalands Avis from 1987 to 1988, before being hired as press secretary for the Socialist Left Party. He left in 1990. He worked as a journalist in Bladet Tromsø in 1990 and Vårt Land from 1991 to 1992, and then as information director in the European Movement Norway from 1992 to 1995 and information consultant in Gambit the next year. He worked as a journalist in Bergens Tidende from 1996 to 2009, and then became an editor in Morgenbladet. In 2012 he returned to Bergens Tidende, where he became political editor i 2013. Since 1 January 2016 he works as a chief foreign affairs commentator for Aftenposten.

He has written seven books, including the 2007 biography on Einar Førde for which he won the Brage Prize.

References

1965 births
Living people
Norwegian journalists
Norwegian biographers
Norwegian male writers
Male biographers
University of Bergen alumni